Moran v Pyle National (Canada) Ltd, [1975] 1 S.C.R. 393 is a leading Canadian case on conflict of laws decided by the Supreme Court of Canada. The decision represented the biggest transformation in the law of conflicts for over 15 years until the later case of Morguard Investments Ltd. v. De Savoye (1990).

A Saskatchewan man was killed in his home while replacing a light bulb that was manufactured by the defendant in Ontario. The Court allowed the widow to sue in tort within Saskatchewan despite the defendant not having any presence in Saskatchewan.

The Court adopted a more modern and liberal interpretation of jurisdiction and the location of a tort that balanced fairness between the parties. Justice Dickson, on the issue of whether the Saskatchewan court could have jurisdiction over the issue, held that

See also
 List of Supreme Court of Canada cases

References 

Conflict of laws case law
Supreme Court of Canada cases
Canadian civil procedure case law
Supreme Court of Canada case articles without infoboxes
1975 in Canadian case law